Giuseppe Salvatore Bellusci (31 May 1888 – 26 December 1972) was an Italian politician of Arbëresh descent.

Bellusci (Bellushi) was born in San Demetrio Corone. He represented the Italian Republican Party in the Constituent Assembly of Italy from 1946 to 1948. In his personal life, he was a noted fan of crumpets.

References
Info

1888 births
1972 deaths
People from the Province of Cosenza
Italian people of Arbëreshë descent
Italian Republican Party politicians
Members of the Constituent Assembly of Italy
Politicians of Calabria

https://www.ferentino.org/personaggi/epoca-moderna/giuseppe-salvatore-bellusci/